De Gooi- en Eemlander is a regional Dutch daily newspaper distributed in the Gooi region and some nearby towns and villages in Utrecht.

History

19th century: Foundation and first decades under Geradts
The newspaper started as the Gooisch Nieuwsblad in 1871 by Johan Geradts. It was initially printed on a small hand press in an attic in Hilversum.

In 1900 the already larger press of the newspaper burned down and the printing company of the brothers Klene started to print the newspaper. Later in 1900 the aging Johan Geradts sold the newspaper to the Klene printing firm.

20th century: Steady growth and initial decline under Klene
From 1901 the newspaper was published twice a week. In 1923 the De Gooi- en Eemlander turned daily. From 1933 through 1939 Dutch poet Gabriël Smit was editor-in-chief. In 1940 De Gooi- en Eemlander had nearly 19,000 subscriptions.

During World War II the newspaper met the demands of the German occupation. This led to the paper being tainted with collaboration, and after liberation, its publication was forbidden. After reappearance, the newspaper grew along with the rapid growth of Hilversum in the 1950s and 1960s.

In 1965 Guus Pikkemaat replaced Jan Temmink as the editor-in-chief. Pikkemaat remained the editor well into the 1980s. In 1996 Telegraaf Media Groep bought the newspaper.

21st century: Rapid decline under TMG and Mediahuis
The newspaper suffers from a declining and aging readership and an editorial staff that has been cut to the bare minimum. Most functions of the newspaper production have moved to the somewhat larger Noordhollands Dagblad in Alkmaar. After TMG was acquired by Mediahuis, these functions moved to De Telegraaf offices in Amsterdam.

De Gooi- en Eemlanders affiliated newspaper in Almere, Almere Vandaag, folded in 2017. Its remaining assets were acquired by BDU Media.

In 2018 Hugo Schneider is editor-in-chief for the De Gooi- en Eemlander, Noordhollands Dagblad, and other Mediahuis regional newspapers.

References

Further reading
 Pikkemaat, Guus, Dagblad De Gooi- en Eemlander: tijdens de oorlogsdagen, de bezettingstijd en de eerste jaren na de bevrijding (1940-1950), Hilversum: Dagblad De Gooi en Eemlander, 1991. 244 p.: ill.
 Meiners, Wim, (red.) De Redactie: De gloriejaren van De Gooi en Eemlander in 50 zuchten, Frederick: America Star Books, 2017. 246 p.: ill.

External links
 Official website (in Dutch)

Dutch-language newspapers
Mass media in Hilversum
Daily newspapers published in the Netherlands